Karatuzsky District is an administrative and municipal district (raion), one of the forty-three in Krasnoyarsk Krai, Russia. It is located in the south of the krai and borders with Kuraginsky District and the Tuva Republic in the east, Yermakovsky District in the south and southwest, and with Shushensky and Minusinsky Districts in the west. Its administrative center is the rural locality (a selo) of Karatuzskoye. Population:  18,795 (2002 Census);  The population of Karatuzskoye accounts for 46.5% of the district's total population.

Geography
The district is located in the Amyl River basin, in the southeastern part of the Minusinsk Hollow at the spurs of eastern Sayan Mountains.

History

The district was founded on April 4, 1924.

Divisions and government
As of 2013, the Head of the district and the Chairman of the District Council is Konstantin A. Tyunin.

References

Notes

Sources

Districts of Krasnoyarsk Krai
States and territories established in 1924